Scalibregma is a genus of polychaetes belonging to the family Scalibregmatidae.

The genus has cosmopolitan distribution.

Species:

Scalibregma abyssorum 
Scalibregma australis 
Scalibregma californicum 
Scalibregma celticum 
Scalibregma hanseni 
Scalibregma inflatum 
Scalibregma robustum 
Scalibregma stenocerum 
Scalibregma wireni

References

Annelids